Renaldo Samsara (born Asturias Renaldo Crawfurd, 19 November 1988) is an Indonesian-English screenwriter, film director, film editor and indie music producer.

Samsara made his directorial debut, Persepsi, with Matthew Hart, the guitarist of Arkarna, during their meeting and music collaboration in 2016. The film stars Nino Fernandez, Nadine Alexandra, Hannah Al Rashid, Irwansyah and many others.

Early life and education 
Samsara was born on 19 November 1988, in Jakarta. His father, Anthony, was of Jewish-Indonesian descent from North Sumatra, and his mother, Cynthia, is of Scottish-Borneo descent. Samsara attended Nanyang Academy of Fine Arts and SAE Institute Singapore at the age of 15, before moving back to Jakarta as an adult.

Filmography

Film

References

External links 
 

1988 births
Living people
Indonesian film directors
Indonesian film editors
Indo people
Indonesian people of Jewish descent
Indonesian people of Scottish descent
Indonesian screenwriters
Indonesian record producers
People from Jakarta